Auerbach is a town in the Vogtlandkreis, Saxony, Germany. It is the regional centre of the eastern Vogtland. The economy is mainly based on textile manufacturing, food processing and machine industry. After Plauen and Reichenbach, Auerbach is the third most populous town in the Vogtlandkreis.

Auerbach was mentioned for the first time in 1282. The town is situated at the declivities above the river Göltzsch at the foot of a castle tower from the 12th century. Landmarks include the towers of the St. Laurentius church, the Catholic Zum Heiligen Kreuz church and the  tower of the castle. The three tall buildings give Auerbach its nickname “the Three Towers Town”.

Demographics 

Historical population (from 1960, as on 31 December):

 Data source from 1998: Saxon State Statistical Office  1 29 October 2 31 August

References

External links 
 Town of Auerbach

Vogtlandkreis